Cartilage tumors, also known as chondrogenic tumors, are a type of bone tumor that develop in cartilage, and are divided into non-cancerous, cancerous and intermediate locally aggressive types.

See also
 WHO blue books

References 

Osseous and chondromatous neoplasia